Gardiner is an unincorporated community and census-designated place in Douglas County, Oregon, United States, across the Umpqua River from Reedsport. It is located on U.S. Route 101. As of the 2010 census, it had a population of 248.

Gardiner is named for a Boston merchant whose ship, the Bostonian, shipwrecked at the mouth of the Umpqua on October 1, 1850. Gardiner was seeking to trade along the river, and most of his goods were saved from the ship and moved to the location that came to be the town of Gardiner. In 1851, the site became the headquarters of the Umpqua customs district, and a post office named "Gardiners City" was established the same year. The name of the post office changed to "Gardiner City" and eventually to its current name.

The Gardiner Historic District, which encompasses nearly all of Gardiner, has been listed on the National Register of Historic Places since 1994. Several steamboats were constructed at Gardiner for trade up the Umpqua River.

A plywood plant opened in Gardiner in 1954, joining the lumber mill (or sawmill) that had been in the town for many years.

Gardiner was formerly the site of the first International Paper mill on the West Coast. The paper mill operated from 1963 until 1999, and was one of the largest employers on the southern Oregon Coast. The mill buildings were demolished in 2006.

A railroad, the Longview, Portland & Northern (LP&N), served the IP mill until it closed. The railroad runs from East Gardiner Junction to the old plant site.

Climate
This region experiences warm (but not hot) and dry summers, with no average monthly temperatures above .  According to the Köppen Climate Classification system, Gardiner has a warm-summer Mediterranean climate, abbreviated "Csb" on climate maps.

Notable people

 Kathryn Clarke, politician
 Alan L. Hart
 Bill Warren, film historian

See also
National Register of Historic Places listings in Douglas County, Oregon
Perkins Lake
Steamboats of the Oregon Coast

References

External links

The Gardiner that Was by Georgina Durbin from the Douglas County Historical Society
Historic images of Gardiner from Salem Public Library

Oregon Coast
Unincorporated communities in Douglas County, Oregon
Census-designated places in Oregon
National Register of Historic Places in Douglas County, Oregon
1851 establishments in Oregon Territory
Census-designated places in Douglas County, Oregon
Unincorporated communities in Oregon
Populated coastal places in Oregon
Populated places established in 1851